Marco Bizot (born 10 March 1991) is a Dutch professional footballer who plays as a goalkeeper for Ligue 1 club Brest and the Netherlands national team.

Club career

Ajax
Born in Hoorn, Netherlands, Marco Bizot started his career in his early youth for SV Westfriezen in Zwaag, Netherlands. This is where he was discovered at age ten, and brought to Ajax's youth academy in 2000, from where he started in the E-youth levels. He joined the Jong Ajax selection for the 2010–11 season, where he received ample playing time under coaches Pieter Huistra and Fred Grim. After a successful season with Jong Ajax, Bizot received a contract extension, and was loaned to Cambuur in the Dutch Eerste Divisie for the 2011–12 season, in order to gain experience and to prove himself as a player.

Groningen
On 14 June 2012, Ajax and Groningen came to the agreement of a direct transfer of Bizot. Bizot developed into a solid Eredivisie goalkeeper and played 50 matches in two season for the team.

Genk
On 22 June 2014, it was announced that Groningen had sold Bizot to Belgian side Genk. He signed a contract for three years.

AZ
On 10 May 2017, Bizot signed a contract at AZ. He was picked as the replacement of Tim Krul, who returned to Newcastle United after a loan spell. Bizot played all 40 official games in the following season and met the finals of the TOTO KNVB Cup. After the summer, he remained consistent with the most clean sheets ever in the Eredivisie. In February 2020 he extended his contract to mid-2022.

Brest 
On 4 August 2021, Brest announced that Bizot had penned a three-year contract with the club, for a reported fee of €1 million. He made his competitive debut for the club on the first matchday of the 2021–22 Ligue 1 season; a 1–1 draw against Lyon. Bizot kept his first clean sheet for Brest on 31 October, which was also the club's first win of the season, a 2–0 home victory against Monaco.

International career
Bizot earned his first full international call up in Ronald Koeman’s first Netherlands squad in March 2018. He made his debut in a friendly against Spain on 11 November 2020.

References

External links
 
 
 
 Voetbal International profile 
 

1991 births
Living people
People from Hoorn
Dutch footballers
Footballers from North Holland
Association football goalkeepers
Netherlands international footballers
Netherlands youth international footballers
Netherlands under-21 international footballers
UEFA Euro 2020 players
AFC Ajax players
SC Cambuur players
FC Groningen players
K.R.C. Genk players
AZ Alkmaar players
Stade Brestois 29 players
Eredivisie players
Eerste Divisie players
Belgian Pro League players
Dutch expatriate footballers
Dutch expatriate sportspeople in Belgium
Expatriate footballers in Belgium
Dutch expatriate sportspeople in France
Expatriate footballers in France
Dutch people of French descent
21st-century Dutch people